"Loopy Ears" (Петлистые уши, Petli′stye U′shi) is a short story by Nobel Prize-winning Russian author Ivan Bunin which was written in 1917 and gave his posthumous 1954 collection its title. The story was first published in the seventh issue of the Slovo anthology (Moscow, 1917) and remains to this day one of the most talked about Bunin's stories, being the first piece of work in the Russian literature featuring a serial killer as the main character. Mark Aldanov considered the story one of Bunin's best.

Some scholars regard "Loopy Ears" as a dark parody on Crime and Punishment and one striking example of Bunin's deep antagonism towards Fyodor Dostoyevsky and the ideas he represented.

Background 
Originally Bunin planned to write a large novel about a serial killer, "vyrodok" (a moral degenerate) named Sokolovych, for which the now known text of the story would form a kind of primal factual basis. In the Russian State Archive of Literature and Art (ЦГАЛИ) there are several expanded versions of the story, each pointing to directions in which it was supposed to develop into a novel. One of them feature as its obvious turning point Sokolovich's words addressed to a policeman: "In this case I am more of a sufferer than a criminal. Why? This does not concern you in any way".

In another rough draft Sokolovich's family past and socio-psychological aspects of an environment were explored. In it, the murderer, arrested in Vologda a month after the act, asks for a permission to  produce a hand-written account of what preceded it and (according to the author) "comes out with something much more cruel and bizarre than might have been expected even taking into account the nature of the atrocity committed."

Crime and Punishment parallels 
According to the literary scholar Aleksandr Dolinin, Looped Ears (that's his version of the title's translation) "rewrites" Crime and Punishment, constructing a "recognizable Dostoevskian world of gloomy, oppressive Saint Petersburg with its misty streets, demonic slums, seedy taverns and hotels, and then exploding it from within." The story's two characters, the murderer Sokolovich and the prostitute Korolkova, his victim, are "the grim travesties of Raskolnikov and Sonia lacking any redeeming moral aspects of their models." Bunin's down-to-earth treatment of murder and prostitution, argues the critic, is intended to debunk Dostoevsky's melodramatic 'humanization' of the subject. Sokolovich takes it upon himself to take issue with the author of Crime and Punishment in his monologue, expounding his own philosophy of murder:

External links 

 Петлистые уши. The original text (Russian).

References

Short stories by Ivan Bunin
1917 short stories